The 1900 Detroit College Tigers football team  was an American football team that represented Detroit College (renamed the University of Detroit in 1911) as an independent during the 1900 college football season. In its first season under head coach John C. Mackey, the team compiled a 3–2 record and outscored its opponents by a total of 71 to 23. Five of the team's opponents were high schools.  The only intercollegiate game was an 11-0 victory over Loyola University Chicago.

Schedule

References

Detroit College Tigers
Detroit Titans football seasons
Detroit College Tigers football
Detroit College Tigers football